Henry Purcell (1844 – January 21, 1931) was a justice of the New York Supreme Court.

References

New York Supreme Court Justices
1931 deaths
1844 births